"El Son de la Negra" is a Mexican folk song, originally from Tepic, Nayarit, best known from an adaptation by Jaliscian musical composer Blas Galindo in 1940 for his suite Sones de mariachi.

It is commonly referred to as the "second national anthem of Mexico."  The masterpiece was presented for the first time in the city of New York, but Jesús Jáuregui, a Mexican ethnologist, claims that throughout its history the song has undergone modifications and arrangements that can hardly be attributed to a single author or epoque. The song has become representative of Mexican folk or relative to Mexico worldwide. Jáureguis's more than two decades of research were presented on 15 July 2010 at a conference held in the state of Nayarit under the patronage of the state's Consejo Nacional para la Cultura y las Artes. Among the specific topics discussed were the origin and authorship of the tune, its first recordings, excerpts from Galindo's memoirs, and photographs of older scores and lyrics.

Lyrics

See also
 Huapango de Moncayo (es), also called the "second national anthem" 
 Afro-Mexicans

References

External links
 Rescatan origen del Son de la Negra from INAH

Spanish-language songs
Songwriter unknown
Year of song unknown
Mexican songs